El corazón del océano is a Spanish period drama television series that originally aired on Antena 3 from January to March 2014. It stars Hugo Silva, Ingrid Rubio, Clara Lago and Álvaro Cervantes, among others.

Premise 
Set in the 16th century, the fiction follows the story of 80 maidens who were sent by the Hispanic Crown to the New World (Asunción) to marry settlers and thus avoid miscegenation, experiencing an odyssey on the high seas and beyond.

Cast 
 Hugo Silva as Juan de Salazar.
 Ingrid Rubio as Mencía Calderón.
  as Clarita de Sanabría.
 Clara Lago as Ana de Rojas.
 Álvaro Cervantes as Alonso.
  as Pelayo.
 Hiba Abouk as Guadalupe.
  as María Sanabria.
 Víctor Clavijo as Hernando de Trejo.
  as Sancha.
  as Pola.
 Anasol as Abana.
 Ilja Rosendahl as Ulrico Schmidels.
 Juan David Agudelo as Fray Carrillo.
  as Isabel Contreras.
 Didier van der Hove as Francisco Becerra.
  as Rui Peña.
  as Bernardí.
 Raúl Gutiérrez as Maese Pedro.
 Albi De Abreu as Capitán Bompere.

Production and release 
The screenplay was written by Manuel Valdivia together with Pablo Barrera, Chus Vallejo, César Vidal Gil and Elena González de Sande. Following a time of shooting in several Colombian cities, production moved to El Puerto de Santa María, Andalusia. Filming wrapped in Huelva in July 2011. Pablo Barrera and  directed the series.

Consisting of 6 episodes with an accumulated running time of 420 minutes, El corazón del océano was presented at the FesTVal in August 2011. It premiered in prime time on Antena 3 on 27 January 2014.  The unexpected release of Velvet on 17 February forced a reschedule from Monday to Wednesday. The broadcasting run ended on 5 March 2014, averaging 2.5 million viewers and a 13.2% audience share.

References 

Spanish-language television shows
Spanish adventure television series
Antena 3 (Spanish TV channel) network series
2010s Spanish drama television series
2014 Spanish television series debuts
2014 Spanish television series endings
Television shows filmed in Spain
Television shows filmed in Colombia
Nautical television series
Television shows set in Paraguay
Television series about the history of Spain
Television series based on Spanish novels
Television series by Globomedia